Hansen is an unincorporated community in Adams and Hall counties, in the United States.

History
Hansen got its start in the year 1879 when the railroad was extended to that point. Hansen was named in honor of a railroad official.

A post office was opened in Hansen in 1879, and remained in operation until it was discontinued in 1955.

References

Unincorporated communities in Adams County, Nebraska
Unincorporated communities in Hall County, Nebraska
Unincorporated communities in Nebraska